Harvey Cedars is a borough in Ocean County, New Jersey, United States. As of the 2010 United States Census, the borough's population was 337, reflecting a decline of 22 (−6.1%) from the 359 counted in the 2000 Census, which had in turn declined by 3 (−0.8%) from the 362 counted in the 1990 Census. The borough borders the Atlantic Ocean on Long Beach Island.

Harvey Cedars was incorporated as a borough by an act of the New Jersey Legislature on December 15, 1894, from portions of Union Township (now Barnegat Township), based on the results of a referendum held on November 20, 1894. The community's post office was initially known as High Point, the name of a neighborhood in the borough that lies at a higher elevation, before a name change was made in the 1930s at the request of the United States Postal Service to differentiate the post office from the northern New Jersey community of High Point in Sussex County.

The majority of the housing units in the borough are seasonal houses used primarily in the summer by owners who live elsewhere, bringing the summer population to 12,000. The borough's quiet character and bay and ocean access make housing very expensive, with many bay or oceanfront houses priced at $2 million or more. Despite the borough's small size, its property was assessed at over $1.28 billion in 2019.

History 

Before Long Beach Island was developed, its northern area, from the Barnegat Inlet to the Great Swamp (now Surf City), was covered with Atlantic white cedar (chamaecyparis thyoides). Early inhabitants of the area harvested salt hay (spartina patens) and seaweed to make a living.

The earliest reference to the area was a deed from 1751 that called the place "Harvest Quarters". The name "Harvey Cedars" may be derived from the "harvest" housing used by these farmers and the "cedars" that grew in the area.

Geography 
According to the United States Census Bureau, the borough had a total area of 1.19 square miles (3.08 km2), including 0.56 square miles (1.45 km2) of land and 0.63 square miles (1.62 km2) of water (52.61%).

Unincorporated communities, localities and place names located partially or completely within the borough include High Point.

The borough borders the Ocean County municipalities of Barnegat Township, Long Beach Township and Stafford Township.

Demographics

Census 2010 

The Census Bureau's 2006–2010 American Community Survey showed that (in 2010 inflation-adjusted dollars) median household income was $106,875 (with a margin of error of +/− $15,693) and the median family income was $112,656 (+/− $8,889). Males had a median income of $85,625 (+/− $32,732) versus $51,875 (+/− $42,840) for females. The per capita income for the borough was $74,525 (+/− $13,683). About 3.0% of families and 4.2% of the population were below the poverty line, including none of those under age 18 and 6.2% of those age 65 or over.

Census 2000 

As of the 2000 United States Census there were 359 people, 167 households, and 112 families residing in the borough. The racial makeup of the borough was 96.94% White, 0.56% African American, 0.28% Native American, 0.28% Asian, 1.95% from other races. Hispanic or Latino of any race were 3.62% of the population.

There were 167 households, out of which 16.8% had children under the age of 18 living with them, 61.7% were married couples living together, 4.2% had a female householder with no husband present, and 32.9% were non-families. 29.3% of all households were made up of individuals, and 15.6% had someone living alone who was 65 years of age or older. The average household size was 2.15 and the average family size was 2.61.

In the borough the population was spread out, with 14.5% under the age of 18, 4.2% from 18 to 24, 22.0% from 25 to 44, 29.0% from 45 to 64, and 30.4% who were 65 years of age or older. The median age was 54 years. For every 100 females, there were 102.8 males. For every 100 females age 18 and over, there were 106.0 males.

The median income for a household in the borough was $61,875, and the median income for a family was $69,722. Males had a median income of $71,042 versus $32,361 for females. The per capita income for the borough was $36,757. About 2.6% of families and 5.1% of the population were below the poverty line, including 5.1% of those under age 18 and 2.9% of those age 65 or over.

Government

Local government 
The Borough of Harvey Cedars has operated under the Walsh Act form of New Jersey municipal government since 1923. The borough is one of 30 municipalities (of the 564) statewide that use the commission form of government. The governing body is comprised of the three-member Board of Commissioners whose members are elected at-large on a non-partisan basis to serve concurrent four-year terms of office in voting held as part of the November general election. Each commissioner is assigned to oversee and administer a department. The Mayor and Deputy Mayor are elected by the Board from among its members. The mayor has no veto power.

, members of the Harvey Cedars Board of Commissioners are
Mayor Jonathan S. Oldham (Commissioner of Public Works, Parks and Public Property), 
John M. Imperiale (Commissioner of Public Affairs and Public Safety) and 
Paul George Rice (Commissioner of Revenue and Finance), all of whom are serving concurrent four-year terms of office that expire on December 31, 2023.

Federal, state and county representation 
Harvey Cedars is located in the 2nd Congressional District and is part of New Jersey's 9th state legislative district.

 

Ocean County is governed by a Board of County Commissioners comprised of five members who are elected on an at-large basis in partisan elections and serving staggered three-year terms of office, with either one or two seats coming up for election each year as part of the November general election. At an annual reorganization held in the beginning of January, the board chooses a Director and a Deputy Director from among its members. , Ocean County's Commissioners (with party affiliation, term-end year and residence) are:

Commissioner Director John P. Kelly (R, 2022, Eagleswood Township),
Commissioner Deputy Director Virginia E. Haines (R, 2022, Toms River),
Barbara Jo Crea (R, 2024, Little Egg Harbor Township)
Gary Quinn (R, 2024, Lacey Township) and
Joseph H. Vicari (R, 2023, Toms River). Constitutional officers elected on a countywide basis are 
County Clerk Scott M. Colabella (R, 2025, Barnegat Light),
Sheriff Michael G. Mastronardy (R, 2022; Toms River) and
Surrogate Jeffrey Moran (R, 2023, Beachwood).

Politics 
As of March 23, 2011, there were a total of 375 registered voters in Harvey Cedars, of which 86 (22.9%) were registered as Democrats, 157 (41.9%) were registered as Republicans and 132 (35.2%) were registered as Unaffiliated. There were no voters registered to other parties. Among the borough's 2010 Census population, 111.3% (vs. 63.2% in Ocean County) were registered to vote, including 125.8% of those ages 18 and over (vs. 82.6% countywide).

In the 2012 presidential election, Republican Mitt Romney received 58.7% of the vote (152 cast), ahead of Democrat Barack Obama with 40.5% (105 votes), and other candidates with 0.8% (2 votes), among the 262 ballots cast by the borough's 412 registered voters (3 ballots were spoiled), for a turnout of 63.6%. In the 2008 presidential election, Republican John McCain received 54.5% of the vote (145 cast), ahead of Democrat Barack Obama with 42.5% (113 votes) and other candidates with 1.1% (3 votes), among the 266 ballots cast by the borough's 384 registered voters, for a turnout of 69.3%. In the 2004 presidential election, Republican George W. Bush received 60.1% of the vote (181 ballots cast), outpolling Democrat John Kerry with 39.5% (119 votes) and other candidates with 0.3% (1 votes), among the 301 ballots cast by the borough's 388 registered voters, for a turnout percentage of 77.6.

In the 2013 gubernatorial election, Republican Chris Christie received 73.6% of the vote (159 cast), ahead of Democrat Barbara Buono with 25.0% (54 votes), and other candidates with 1.4% (3 votes), among the 221 ballots cast by the borough's 423 registered voters (5 ballots were spoiled), for a turnout of 52.2%. In the 2009 gubernatorial election, Republican Chris Christie received 56.8% of the vote (126 ballots cast), ahead of  Democrat Jon Corzine with 35.1% (78 votes), Independent Chris Daggett with 5.9% (13 votes) and other candidates with 0.5% (1 votes), among the 222 ballots cast by the borough's 355 registered voters, yielding a 62.5% turnout.

Education 

For pre-kindergarten through sixth grade, public school students attend the Long Beach Island Consolidated School District, which also serves students from Barnegat Light, Long Beach Township, Ship Bottom and Surf City. As of the 2020–2021 school year, the district, comprised of two schools, had an enrollment of 215 students and 30.7 classroom teachers (on an FTE basis), for a student–teacher ratio of 7.0:1. Schools in the district (with 2020–2021 enrollment data from the National Center for Education Statistics) are 
Ethel Jacobsen School in Surf City with 111 students in pre-kindergarten to second grade and 
Long Beach Island Grade School in Ship Bottom with 125 students in grades 3–6. The district's board of education is comprised of nine members who are directly elected from the constituent municipalities on a staggered basis, with three members elected each year. Of the nine seats, one is elected from Harvey Cedars.

Students in public school for seventh through twelfth grades attend the Southern Regional School District, which serves the five municipalities in the Long Beach Island Consolidated School District, along with students from Beach Haven and Stafford Township, as well as students from Ocean Township (including its Waretown section) who attend as part of a sending/receiving relationship. Schools in the district (with 2020–2021 enrollment data from the National Center for Education Statistics) are 
Southern Regional Middle School with 902 students in grades 7–8 and 
Southern Regional High School with 1,975 students in grades 9–12. Both schools are in the Manahawkin section of Stafford Township.

At the time of its founding in 1957, the Southern Regional School District had a roughly equal number of students from Long Beach Island and Stafford Township.
By 2016, the overwhelming majority of students were from Stafford Township, accounting for nearly 90% of enrollment. These demographic changes have led to significant discrepancies in the cost per pupil sent to the district from each community, with Harvey Cedars and Long Beach Township paying more than $200,000 per pupil, while Stafford Township's costs are $3,600 for each student. These widely different costs result from a formula that uses the taxable property value in each municipality to apportion costs, which means that municipalities with relatively high property values and small numbers of students pay a higher share of total district costs. Some residents of Long Beach Island communities are seeking to amend the formula to take advantage of a 1993 law that allows districts to use both property value and enrollment to allocate property taxes, though that would require passage of referendums in each municipality.

Transportation

Roads and highways 

No Interstate, U.S. or state highways serve Harvey Cedars. The main road serving the borough is County Route 607 (Long Beach Boulevard).

Public transportation 
Ocean County Ride provides bus service on the OC9 LBI North route between Barnegat Light and Manahawkin / Stafford Township.

The LBI Shuttle operates along Long Beach Boulevard, providing free service every 5 to 20 minutes from 10:00 AM to 10:00 PM. It serves the Long Beach Island municipalities / communities of Barnegat Light, Loveladies, Harvey Cedars, North Beach, Surf City, Ship Bottom, Long Beach Township, Beach Haven and Holgate.

Climate

According to the Köppen climate classification system, Harvey Cedars, New Jersey has a humid subtropical climate (Cfa) with hot, moderately humid summers, cool winters and year-around precipitation. Cfa climates are characterized by all months having an average mean temperature > 32.0 °F (> 0.0 °C), at least four months with an average mean temperature ≥ 50.0 °F (≥ 10.0 °C), at least one month with an average mean temperature ≥ 71.6 °F (≥ 22.0 °C) and no significant precipitation difference between seasons. During the summer months in Harvey Cedars, a cooling afternoon sea breeze is present on most days, but episodes of extreme heat and humidity can occur with heat index values ≥ 95 °F (≥ 35 °C). During the winter months, episodes of extreme cold and wind can occur with wind chill values < 0 °F (< −18 °C). The plant hardiness zone at Harvey Cedars Beach is 7a with an average annual extreme minimum air temperature of 3.6 °F (−15.8 °C).

Ecology

According to the A. W. Kuchler U.S. potential natural vegetation types, Harvey Cedars, New Jersey would have a dominant vegetation type of Northern Cordgrass (73) with a dominant vegetation form of Coastal Prairie (20).

Notable people 

People who were born in, residents of, or otherwise closely associated with Harvey Cedars include:

 Wendy Mae Chambers (born 1953), composer
 Paul L. Gill (1894–1938), watercolor painter and teacher
 Sue May Gill (1887–1989), artist and member of the Philadelphia Ten
 Leon Kelly (1901–1982), artist best known for his contributions to Surrealism
 Nathan Gregory Silvermaster (1898–1964), economist with the United States War Production Board during World War II, who was the head of a large Communist spy ring in the U.S. government

References

External links 

 Harvey Cedars website
 Harvey Cedars Taxpayers Association
 Long Beach Island School District
 
 School Data for the Long Beach Island School District, National Center for Education Statistics
 Southern Regional School District

 
1894 establishments in New Jersey
Boroughs in Ocean County, New Jersey
Jersey Shore communities in Ocean County
Long Beach Island
Populated places established in 1894
Walsh Act